Fare zone 3 is an inner zone of Transport for London's zonal fare system used for calculating the price of tickets for travel on the London Underground, London Overground, Docklands Light Railway and, since 2007, on National Rail services.

List of stations

The following stations are in zone 3:

Changes
January 1999: East India and Pudding Mill Lane (DLR) from Zone 3 to Zone 2/3 boundary
January 2000: Beckton, Cyprus, Gallions Reach and Beckton Park (DLR) from Zone 4 to Zone 3
January 2008: Hampstead Heath from Zone 3 to Zone 2, Willesden Junction from Zone 3 to Zone 2/3 boundary and Acton Central from Zone 2 to Zone 3
January 2016: Stratford, Stratford High Street, Stratford International DLR station, West Ham, Canning Town, Star Lane and Abbey Road from Zone 3 to Zone 2/3 boundary.

See also

References